Callichromatini is a tribe of beetles in the subfamily Cerambycinae, which include the following genera:

 Agaleptoides Lepesme, 1956
 Agaleptus Gahan, 1904
 Amblyontium Bates, 1879
 Anexamita Schmidt, 1922
 Anisoceraea Schmidt, 1922
 Anubis Thomson, 1864
 Aphrodisium Thomson, 1864
 Aromia Audinet-Serville, 1833
 Aromiella Podaný, 1971
 Asmedia Pascoe, 1866
 Borneochroma Vives, Bentanachs & Chew, 2008
 Brachyhospes Juhel & Bentanachs, 2012
 Bradycnemis Waterhouse, 1877
 Brevechelidonium Vives, Bentanachs & Chew, 2009
 Callichroma Latreille, 1817
 Cataphrodisium Aurivillius, 1907
 Cephalizus Schmidt, 1922
 Chelidonium Thomson, 1864
 Chewchroma Bentanachs & Vives, 2009
 Chloridolum Thomson, 1864
 Chromacilla Schmidt, 1922
 Chromalizus Schmidt, 1922
 Clavomela Adlbauer, 2000
 Cloniophorus Quedenfeldt, 1882
 Closteromerus Dejean, 1835
 Cnemidochroma Schmidt, 1924
 Colobizus Schmidt, 1922
 Compsomera White, 1853
 Conamblys Schmidt, 1922
 Cotychroma Martins & Napp, 2005
 Crassichroma Vives, Bentanachs & Chew, 2009
 Ctenomaeus Schmidt, 1922
 Cycloclonius Schmidt, 1922
 Dictator Thomson, 1878
 Dolichaspis Gahan, 1890
 Dubianella Morati & Huet, 2004
 Embrikstrandia Plavilstshikov, 1931
 Eugoides Aurivillius, 1904
 Euporus Audinet-Serville, 1834
 Evgoa Fåhraeus, 1872
 Eximia Jordan, 1894
 Exoparyphus Schmidt, 1922
 Gauresthes Bates, 1889
 Gestriana Podaný, 1971
 Gracilichroma Vives, Bentanachs & Chew, 2008
 Gressittichroma Vives, Bentanachs & Chew, 2009
 Griphapex Jordan, 1894
 Guitelia Oberthür, 1911
 Hadromastix Schmidt, 1922
 Hayashichroma Vives, Bentanachs & Chew, 2008
 Helymaeus Thomson, 1864
 Hexamitodera Heller, 1896
 Homaloceraea Schmidt, 1922
 Hoplomeces Aurivillius, 1916
 Hosmaeus Juhel, 2011
 Hospes Jordan, 1894
 Huedepohliana Heffern, 2002
 Hybunca Schmidt, 1922
 Hypargyra Gahan, 1890
 Hypatium Thomson, 1864
 Hypocrites Fåhraeus, 1872
 Ipothalia Pascoe, 1867
 Jonthodes Audinet-Serville, 1833
 Jonthodina Achard, 1911
 Kipandia Bentanachs & Drouin, 2015
 Laosaphrodisium Bentanachs, 2012
 Leptochroma Vives, 2013
 Leptosiella Morati & Huet, 2004
 Linsleychroma Giesbert, 1998
 Litomeces Murray, 1870
 Litopus Audinet-Serville, 1833
 Luzonochroma Vives, 2012
 Macrosaspis Adlbauer, 2009
 Malayanochroma Bentanachs & Drouin, 2013
 Mattania Fairmaire, 1894
 Mecosaspis Thomson, 1864
 Metallichroma Aurivillius, 1903
 Micromaeus Schmidt, 1922
 Mimochelidonium Bentanachs & Drouin, 2013
 Mionochroma Schmidt, 1924
 Mombasius Bates, 1879
 Monnechroma Napp & Martins, 2005
 Moratichroma Bentanachs, Morati & Vives, 2010
 Namibomeces Adlbauer, 2001
 Neorygocera Hedicke, 1923
 Niisatochroma Vives & Bentanachs, 2010
 Niraeus Newman, 1840
 Nothopygus Lacordaire, 1869
 Odontochroma Vives, 2015
 Oligosmerus Kolbe, 1894
 Orphnodula Schmidt, 1922
 Osphranteria Redtenbacher, 1850
 Otaromia Aurivillius, 1911
 Oxyprosopus Thomson, 1864
 Pachymeces Juhel, 2012
 Pachyteria Audinet-Serville, 1833
 Parachelidonium Vives, Bentanachs & Chew, 2008
 Paracolobizus Juhel, 2011
 Paraguitelia Quentin & Villiers, 1971
 Parandrocephalus Heller, 1916
 Paraphrodisium Bentanachs & Drouin, 2013
 Pelidnopedilon Schmidt, 1922
 Phasganocnema Schmidt, 1922
 Philematium Thomson, 1864
 Philomeces Kolbe, 1893
 Phrosyne Murray, 1870
 Phyllocnema Thomson, 1861
 Phyllocnemida Péringuey, 1899
 Phyllomaeus Schmidt, 1922
 Plinthocoelium Schmidt, 1924
 Podanychroma Vives, Bentanachs & Chew, 2007
 Polyzonus Dejean, 1835
 Promeces Audinet-Serville, 1834
 Promecidus Fåhraeus, 1872
 Psephania Morati & Huet, 2004
 Pseudictator Juhel, 2015
 Pseudochelidonium Vives, Bentanachs & Chew, 2007
 Pseudoeuchitonia Bentanachs, Morati & Vives, 2010
 Pseudopolyzonus Bentanachs, 2012
 Psilacestes Schmidt, 1922
 Psilomastix Schmidt, 1922
 Rhadinomaeus Schmidt, 1922
 Rhopalizarius Schmidt, 1922
 Rhopalizida Jordan, 1894
 Rhopalizodes Schmidt, 1922
 Rhopalizus Thomson, 1864
 Rhopalomeces Schmidt, 1922
 Scalenus Gistel, 1848
 Schmidtiana Podaný, 1971
 Schwarzerium Matsushita, 1933
 Sinochroma Bentanachs & Drouin, 2013
 Sphingacestes Schmidt, 1922
 Stenochroma Vives, Bentanachs & Chew, 2009
 Sumatrochroma Vives, Bentanachs & Chew, 2007
 Synaptola Bates, 1879
 Tarsotropidus Schmidt, 1922
 Tavakiliana Bentanachs, Garreau & Jiroux, 2014
 Thompsoniana Podaný, 1971
 Trichomaeus Aurivillius, 1927
 Turkaromia Danilevsky, 1993
 Utopileus Schmidt, 1922
 Vittatocrites Adlbauer, 2002
 Xanthospila Fairmaire, 1884
 Xystochroma Schmidt, 1924
 Zambizus Juhel, 2016
 Zonochroma Vives, 2017
 Zonopteroides Podaný, 1968
 Zonopterus Hope, 1842

References

 
Polyphaga tribes